Richard Beavoir Berens (16 December 1801 – 25 February 1859) was an English amateur cricketer who played first-class cricket in 1819 for Hampshire and then reappeared in 1830 to play for Gentlemen of Kent. He was a brother of Henry Berens. He made four known appearances in first-class matches.

His grandson Richard played first-class cricket in the 1890s.

References

1801 births
1859 deaths
English cricketers
English cricketers of 1787 to 1825
English cricketers of 1826 to 1863
Hampshire cricketers
Gentlemen of Kent cricketers